was a professional wrestling event promoted by DDT Pro-Wrestling (DDT). The event took place on August 20, 2017, in Tokyo at the Ryōgoku Kokugikan. The event featured seventeen matches, seven of which were contested for championships. The event aired on Fighting TV Samurai and on DDT's video on demand service DDT Universe.

Storylines
The Ryōgoku Peter Pan 2017 event featured seventeen professional wrestling matches that involved different wrestlers from pre-existing scripted feuds and storylines. Wrestlers portrayed villains, heroes, or less distinguishable characters in the scripted events that built tension and culminated in a wrestling match or series of matches.

By winning the King of DDT tournament on June 25, Tetsuya Endo earned a title match in the main event against KO-D Openweight Champion Konosuke Takeshita.

Event

Preliminary matches
First was the "Gota Ihashi Ryōgoku 5-Match Series", where Gota Ihashi wrestled five Street Fight dark matches against five different opponents. He entered the first match of the series as the reigning King of Dark Champion and defeated Dai Suzuki in less than a minute to lose the title (per the rules of this championship, the title is awarded to the loser of the match). After that, he defeated Gorgeous Matsuno but lost to Mad Paulie, former mixed martial artist Rocky Kawamura and Lingerie Mutoh in quick succession.

The second match of the undercard was a Tokyo Joshi Pro Wrestling Rumble rules match for the Ironman Heavymetalweight Championship. Former NEO Japan Ladies Pro-Wrestling president and CEO Tetsuya Koda was the 1,269th champion entering the match first. He was pinned by Nodoka-Oneesan who became the 1,270th champion. Nodoka was eliminated by Mizuki (1,271st champion) who was then eliminated by Yuu who won the match and became the 1,272nd champion.

On the main card, first was a tag team match that saw the DDT debut of Yuki Iino.

Next was a match for the inaugural KO-D 10-Man Tag Team Championship, a title meant for teams of five wrestlers.

Next was a match pitting Jiro "Ikemen" Kuroshio from Wrestle-1 against Shunma Katsumata.

Next was a four-way tag team match that saw the participation of Kaz Hayashi from Wrestle-1. The match was fought under a "no touch" rule meaning that, unlike in a classic tag team four-way match, each team always had a legal man in the ring. 

In the next match, Dick Togo, Yasu Urano and Antonio Honda challenged Shuten-dōji (Kudo, Yukio Sakaguchi and Masahiro Takanashi) for the KO-D 6-Man Tag Team Championship.

Next, Danshoku Dino and Sanshiro Takagi faced each other in a "Full Authority vs. Marriage Weapon Rumble" match in which various weapons secretly chosen by the participants beforehand were being introduced one after another at regular intervals. Dino won the bout and, as a result, gained full authority over DDT. Had Takagi won, Dino would have been forced to get married. As part of the "weapons" used in the match, Kendo Kashin and Mitsuo Momota (accompanied by his family) fought in an impromptu Weapon match that quickly ended in a no contest.

Next was a DDT Extreme Championship match between challenger Akito and champion Daisuke Sasaki. Per the rules of the title, the champion chooses the stipulation of the matches. Sasaki decided that this match would be a Hair vs. Hair (here dubbed as Cabellera Contra Cabellera) Hardcore Submission match.

Next, Harashima and Naomichi Marufuji challenged Shigehiro Irie and Kazusada Higuchi for the KO-D Tag Team Championship in a match sponsored by Uchicomi!.

Main event
In the main event, Tetsuya Endo challenged Konosuke Takeshita for the KO-D Openweight Championship. Takeshita won the bout and was granted a 2,000,000 yen prize by Good Com Asset, the sponsor of the match.

Results

Rumble rules match

Footnotes

References

External links
The official DDT Pro-Wrestling website
Ryōgoku Peter Pan 2017 at ProWrestlingHistory.com

DDT Peter Pan
2017 in professional wrestling
August 2017 events in Japan
Professional wrestling in Tokyo
2017 in Tokyo
Events in Tokyo